(born May 24, 1948) is a Japanese former professional baseball first baseman in Nippon Professional Baseball. He played for the Hankyu Braves from 1969 to 1982, Hiroshima Toyo Carp in 1983, Kintetsu Buffaloes from 1984 to 1985, Yomiuri Giants in 1986 and the Nankai Hawks in 1987. He was the Pacific League MVP in 1975.

References

1948 births
Living people
Baseball people from Shizuoka Prefecture
Japanese baseball players
Nippon Professional Baseball infielders
Hankyu Braves players
Hiroshima Toyo Carp players
Kintetsu Buffaloes players
Yomiuri Giants players
Nankai Hawks players
Nippon Professional Baseball MVP Award winners
Nippon Professional Baseball coaches
Japanese baseball coaches